The 1955 Torneo Godó was the third edition of the Torneo Godó annual tennis tournament played on clay courts in Barcelona, Spain and it took place from May 10–15, 1955.

Seeds

Draw

Finals

Earlier rounds

First round
Only three first round matches were played, the rest of the players received a bye into the second round.

Those three round matches were the following matches:

  Draper def.  Carbó 6/2, 6/1.
  Walter def.  Catá 6/3, 5/7, 6/1.
  Bartrolí def.  Alaponst 6/3, 6/2.

Top half

Bottom half

External links
 ITF – Tournament details
 Official tournament website
 ATP tournament profile

Barcelona Open (tennis)
Godo
Spain